As pertaining to the playing of a single reed woodwind instrument (such as a saxophone or clarinet), a setup is the choice in reeds and mouthpieces a person has made. Players will often have several setups of a selection of these reeds and mouthpieces: one for jazz playing, one for legit playing, etc.

Woodwind instruments